Beattock Summit is the highest point of the West Coast Main Line (WCML) railway and of the A74(M) motorway as they cross between Dumfries and Galloway and South Lanarkshire in south west Scotland.

Railway history 
The highest point on the Caledonian Railway Main Line north of the border (built by the Caledonian Railway and opened on 15 February 1848), it is located 52 miles (83 km) south of Glasgow Central and 349 miles (558 km) north of London Euston stations. 

The height of the summit is 1,033 feet (315 m) above sea level, which is reached by the adjacent A74(M) motorway. The summit is the watershed between the River Clyde to the north and Evan Water, a tributary of the River Annan to the south. The northbound climb has a  ascent, with gradients of up to 1 in 69 (1 foot of rising or falling gradient for every 69 feet of distance) which made it a notoriously severe climb in the days of steam locomotives.

Steam locomotives frequently required banking assistance in getting their heavy trains up the incline, particularly in the northbound direction, which had steeper gradients. There was an engine shed at Beattock which had banking locomotives on standby twenty-four hours per day to minimise train delays.

The severity of the climb to the summit is referenced in W. H. Auden's poem Night Mail, written in 1936 for the G.P.O. Film Unit's celebrated production of the same name.

The railway was electrified in the early-1970s. Electric locomotives, as far back as the Class 86, as well as today's Avanti West Coast services, climb the gradient without assistance.

Private station
The summit was the location of a private halt from 1900 to around 1926. 1966

References

Notes

Sources 
 
 
 
 
 Beattock Summit on navigable OS map
 British Transport Films, (1974). "Wires over the Border". Disc One, Track 5, In: British Transport Films Collection. Volume 3: Running a Railway. (DVD Format), BFIVD720.

Mountain passes of Scotland
Roads in Scotland
Disused railway stations in South Lanarkshire
Former Caledonian Railway stations
Railway stations in Great Britain opened in 1900
Railway stations in Great Britain closed in 1926
1900 establishments in Scotland
1926 disestablishments in Scotland
Private railway stations
Railway inclines in the United Kingdom
West Coast Main Line